Ishimbayevo (İşembay) is a rural locality (a selo) and the administrative centre of Ishimbayevsky Selsoviet, Salavatsky District, Bashkortostan, Russia. The population was 463 as of 2010. There are 8 streets.

Geography 
Ishimbayevo is located 38 km southwest of Maloyaz (the district's administrative centre) by road. Mindishevo is the nearest rural locality.

References 

Rural localities in Salavatsky District